Henrique de Souza Martins (born 14 November 1991 in Campinas) is a Brazilian competitive swimmer.

International career

2008–12
He participated at 2008 FINA Youth World Swimming Championships in Monterrey.

At the 2011 Summer Universiade in Shenzhen, China, Martins won a silver medal in the 4×100-metre freestyle relay.

2013–16
Martins entered into a University in 2013, in a course of Tourism.

At the 2014 FINA World Swimming Championships (25 m) in Doha, Qatar, Martins won four medals in four Brazilian relays,  by participating at heats. He won the gold medal in the Men's 4 × 50 metre medley relay, Men's 4 × 100 metre medley relay, 4 × 50 metre mixed medley relay, and a bronze medal in the 4 × 50 metre mixed freestyle relay. Martins also finished 8th in the Men's 4 × 100 metre freestyle relay, 15th in the Men's 50 metre butterfly and 16th in the Men's 50 metre backstroke.

At the 2015 Summer Universiade in Gwangju, South Korea, Martins won two gold medals in the 100-metre freestyle and in the 50-metre butterfly, and a silver medal in the 100-metre freestyle.

2016 Summer Olympics

At the 2016 Summer Olympics, Martins finished 6th in the Men's 4 × 100 metre medley relay, and 21st in the Men's 100 metre butterfly.

2017-20
At the 2017 World Aquatics Championships in Budapest, in the Men's 50 metre butterfly, he went to his first World Championship individual final of his career, finishing in 6th place. He also finished 11th in the Men's 100 metre butterfly, and 5th In the Men's 4 × 100 metre medley relay, along with Guilherme Guido, João Gomes Júnior and Marcelo Chierighini.

References

External links 
 
 
 

1991 births
Living people
Brazilian male freestyle swimmers
Sportspeople from Campinas
Medalists at the FINA World Swimming Championships (25 m)
Male butterfly swimmers
Swimmers at the 2016 Summer Olympics
Olympic swimmers of Brazil
Universiade medalists in swimming
Universiade gold medalists for Brazil
Universiade silver medalists for Brazil
Universiade bronze medalists for Brazil
Medalists at the 2011 Summer Universiade
Medalists at the 2015 Summer Universiade
Medalists at the 2017 Summer Universiade
21st-century Brazilian people